Krechinsky's Wedding is a 1953 Soviet comedy film directed by Vasili Vanin and Aleksey Zolotnitskiy. It is based on the play of the same name by Aleksandr Sukhovo-Kobylin.

Cast
 Yuri Fomichyov
 Viktor Kostetskiy 
 Marina Kuznetsova 
 Mikhail Nazvanov 
 Vyacheslav Novikov as Fyodor  
 Lev Petropavlovski 
 Georgiy Petrovskiy as Nakanor Savvich Bek  
 Boris Smirnov 
 Pavel Tarasov 
 Olga Vikland as Atueva  
 Zoya Vinogradova

References

Bibliography 
 Fortune, Richard. Alexander Sukhovo-Kobylin. Gale, 1982.

External links 
 

1953 films
Soviet comedy films
1953 comedy films
1950s Russian-language films
Soviet films based on plays
Soviet black-and-white films